Městečko Trnávka is a municipality and village in Svitavy District in the Pardubice Region of the Czech Republic. It has about 1,400 inhabitants.

Administrative parts
Villages of Bohdalov, Lázy, Ludvíkov, Mezihoří, Nová Roveň, Pacov, Petrůvka, Pěčíkov, Plechtinec, Přední Arnoštov and Stará Roveň are administrative parts of Městečko Trnávka.

Geography

It lies mostly in the Podorlická Uplands, but the eastern part of the municipal territory extends into the Zábřeh Highlands and the southern part into the Boskovice Furrow.

History
A village called Staré Trnávky ("Old Trnávky") existed already in the 13th century and in around 1300, the village Nové Trnávky ("New Trnávky") was founded. The first written mention is from 1308.

In 1918 both villages were merged under the name "Trnávka" and in 1929 its name was changed to "Městečko Trnávka".

Due to the Munich Agreement, the municipality became part of Nazi Germany in 1938. After the World War II in 1945 the ethnically German inhabitants were lynched and subsequently expelled. The area was later repopulated by Czechs.

Sights

The landmarks of Městečko Trnávka are the ruin of the Cimburk Castle and the Church of Saint James the Great. The church is a late Baroque building from 1752.

Cimburk Castle was founded around 1300. In the 15th and 16th centuries, it was most likely rebuilt, fortified and expanded. It was destroyed in 1645 and became a ruin.

Notable people
Wenzel Müller (1767–1835), Austrian composer
Franz Spina (1868–1938), Sudeten German politician

References

External links

Villages in Svitavy District